Enfield and Haringey is a constituency represented in the London Assembly.

It consists of the combined area of the London Borough of Enfield and the London Borough of Haringey.

Overlapping constituencies
The equivalent Westminster seats are:

Edmonton (Labour)
Enfield North (Labour)
Enfield Southgate (Labour)
Hornsey and Wood Green (Labour)
Tottenham (Labour)

Assembly Members

Mayoral election results 
Below are the results for the candidate which received the highest share of the popular vote in the constituency at each mayoral election.

Assembly election results

References

London Assembly constituencies
Politics of the London Borough of Haringey
Politics of the London Borough of Enfield
2000 establishments in England
Constituencies established in 2000